Branivoje Jovanović (Kisiljevo, near Požarevac, 23 May 1883 - Petraljica, near Kumanovo, 30 May 1905), known by the nom de guerre Brana (Брана), was a Chetnik vojvoda (commander).

Life
He was born in Kisiljevo, near Požarevac on 23 May 1883. He graduated from the gymnasium in Belgrade and Šabac and studied military tactics at the Military Academy in Belgrade before joining the Serbian Chetnik Organization. He was among the first Chetniks who crossed the border over to the Ottoman territory. He participated in the Fight on Čelopek. Brana and his compatriots Bogdan Jugović Hajnc, Novica Leovac, Petar Poptašković, and others were in the village of Petraljica when Turks who had been tipped of their location surrounded them. The Chetniks locked themselves in two houses, which the Turks set aflame. Brana and his band were burnt to death. His remains were excavated the next day and buried by the Petraljica church. The events were recorded in poetry.

See also
 List of Chetnik voivodes

References

Sources

1905 deaths
People from the Kingdom of Serbia
Serbian military personnel
Chetniks of the Macedonian Struggle
People from Veliko Gradište
1883 births